Leedvermaak is a 1989 Dutch drama film directed by Frans Weisz. The film was selected as the Dutch entry for the Best Foreign Language Film at the 62nd Academy Awards, but was not accepted as a nominee.

Cast
Catherine ten Bruggencate: Lea
Pierre Bokma: Nico
Kitty Courbois: Ada, Lea's mother
Peter Oosthoek: Simon, Lea's father
Annet Nieuwenhuyzen:  Riet 
Rijk de Gooyer: Zwart 
Sigrid Koetse: Duifje

See also
 List of submissions to the 62nd Academy Awards for Best Foreign Language Film
 List of Dutch submissions for the Academy Award for Best Foreign Language Film

References

External links 
 

1989 films
1989 drama films
Dutch drama films
1980s Dutch-language films